The Nebraska attorney general is the chief law enforcement officer and lawyer for the U.S. state of Nebraska.

List of attorneys general
Parties

Notes

References
AG Office document (cached)

External links
 Nebraska Attorney General official website
 Nebraska Attorney General articles at ABA Journal
 News and Commentary at FindLaw
 Nebraska Revised Statutes at Law.Justia.com
 U.S. Supreme Court Opinions - "Cases with title containing: State of Nebraska" at FindLaw
 Nebraska State Bar Association
 Nebraska Attorney General Doug Peterson profile at National Association of Attorneys General